Seda Bakan (born 10 October 1985) is a Turkish actress. Her maternal family, who are of Turkish origin, emigrated from Thessaloniki (which until 1912 was Selânik in the Ottoman Empire, but now is in Greece). Her paternal family is of Bosnian origin who emigrated from Sarajevo.
 
She is best known for comedy roles in films and as Eda in Behzat Ç. hit crime series, as Feyza in Kardeş Payı hit comedy series. She played in the movie Arif V 216, which as of April 2021 is the 10th most-watched movie of all time in Turkey according to Box Office.

Filmography

References

1985 births
Living people
People from Gebze
Turkish people of Bosniak descent
Turkish film actresses
Turkish television actresses
21st-century Turkish actresses